Kangean may refer to:

Kangean Island, situated in the north of Bali, Indonesia
Kangean Islands, Kangean and its surrounding islands
Kangeanese people, an ethnic group native to the Kangean Islands
Kangean language, spoken in the Kangean Islands
Kangean 1908 meteorite fall, see meteorite falls

See also 

 

Language and nationality disambiguation pages